The 2016–17 season was the 34th season in Getafe CF 's history.

Squad

Competitions

Overall

Liga

League table

Play-offs

Copa del Rey

References

Getafe CF seasons
Getafe CD